I Cry, I Smile is the second full-length studio release from noted R&B/soul songwriter/producer Narada Michael Walden.  Released in 1977 on Atlantic Records, it marked the first time Walden himself took on the bulk of the production duties; as stated on the back of the record jacket: "Produced by Narada Michael Walden".

Track listing
All songs written and arranged by Narada Michael Walden.

"I Need Your Love" 3:41
"Better Man" 4:19
"Soul Bird" 4:32
"I Remember" 4:30
"Oneness-Cry" 4:57
"Mango Bop" 4:43
"Rainbow-Sky" 1:17
"I Cry, I Smile" 5:46
"Heaven's Just a Step Away" 4:31
"So Long" 4:22

Personnel
Narada Michael Walden - vocals, drums, percussion, keyboards
Christine Faith, Elisa Delieson, Cheryl Alexander - backing vocals
Hiram Bullock, Raymond Gomes - guitars
Clifford Carter - keyboards
Neil Jason - bass
Herbie Mann, Norma Jean Bell - flute, reeds
Sammy Figueroa, Rafael Cruz - percussion
Michael Gibbs - string arrangements and conducting

Production
Produced by Narada Michael Walden
Associate Producer: Jimmy Douglas
Recording Engineer: Jimmy Douglas, assisted by Randy Mason
Mixed by Jerry Smith; assisted by Steven Shore
Mastered by Dennis King at Atlantic Studios

References

External links
I Cry, I Smile at discogs

1977 albums
Atlantic Records albums
Albums produced by Narada Michael Walden
Narada Michael Walden albums